Mojugara Sogasugara is a 1995 Indian Kannada romantic drama film written and directed by Vijay. The film marks actor Vishnuvardhan's 150th film. Vishnuvardhan appeared in dual roles, along with Shruti and Sonakshi in other pivotal roles. The movie is a remake of 1964 Telugu movie Ramudu Bheemudu.

Cast 

 Vishnuvardhan as in dual role 
 Vijay, an innocent man 
 Vinod, a fun-loving man
 Shruti as Shanta, Vijay’s lover
 Sonakshi as Anjana, Vinod’s lover
 Doddanna as Vijay and Vinod’s uncle
 Lokesh as Bhoopathi Rao
 Pandari Bai as Vinod's adopted mother
 Tennis Krishna as Vinod's friend 
 Jayanthi as Sulochana, Vijay and Vinod’s sister
 Sathya Bhama 
 Sihi Kahi Chandru as Bhujang Rao 
 Rama Murthy as Govinda 
 Keerthi
 Dingri Nagaraj
 Shivaram
 Baby Ranjitha as Meena
 Rajanand as Raghunatha Rai 
 Sathyajit
 Kunigal Vasanth

Release
The movie was certified on 10 February and released on 3 March 1995.

Soundtrack 
The music of the film was composed by and lyrics written by Hamsalekha. After release, the soundtrack was well received. Audio was released on Lahari Music.

The song Kannadave Nammamma of this film is rated as one of the top 10 Kannada patriotic songs by Filmibeat.

References 

1995 films
1990s Kannada-language films
Indian romantic comedy-drama films
Films scored by Hamsalekha
Twins in Indian films
Kannada remakes of Telugu films
Films directed by Vijay (director)